Jazz Running is a unique technique used in marching bands and drum corps that is used to counter a dip in height commonly experienced when covering long distances at speeds that would not be practical for standard marching techniques. Although all marching styles are different, Jazz Running is done by pushing off with a leg, causing the performer to lunge forward, landing on their toes, and pushing off with that leg and so on.

Jazz running is different from traditional marching techniques such as the roll step (also known as "glide step") which usually involve keeping both legs as straight as possible and leading each step with the heel and is used widely in corps and military branches. Another common step used by mostly college marching bands involves bending the legs and making sure that the toe is the first part of the foot to leave and to touch the ground. Jazz running can allow performers to move greater distances while maintaining balance and without bouncing. In marching band and drum corps, the model used for step size is an 8 to 5 which means that 8 steps are taken to go five yards (the distance between yard lines). A jazz run usually is not used unless the step size becomes 4 to 5 or larger, but if the distance covered with this step size is small enough, it is possible to traverse it using traditional marching technique but it may feel or look awkward.

Marching bands